The 33rd Daytime Emmy Awards, commemorating excellence in American daytime programming from 2005, was held on Friday, April 28, 2006 at the Kodak Theatre in Los Angeles. This was the first time that the Daytime Emmys were held outside New York. ABC televised the ceremonies in the United States. Creative Arts Emmy Awards were presented on April 22, 2006, while nominations were announced on February 8.

This year's Lifetime Achievement Award went to Caroll Spinney, a television entertainer for over four decades, who has portrayed Big Bird and Oscar the Grouch on Sesame Street since 1969, appearing in over 4,000 episodes.

Nominations and winners
The following is a partial list of nominees, with winners in bold:

Outstanding Drama Series
As the World Turns
General Hospital
Guiding Light
The Young and the Restless

Outstanding Lead Actor in a Drama Series
Maurice Benard (Sonny Corinthos, General Hospital)
Anthony Geary (Luke Spencer, General Hospital)
Thorsten Kaye (Zach Slater, All My Children)
Robert Newman (Joshua Lewis, Guiding Light)
Ron Raines (Alan Spaulding, Guiding Light)

Outstanding Lead Actress in a Drama Series
Bobbie Eakes (Krystal Carey, All My Children)
Beth Ehlers (Harley Cooper, Guiding Light)
Susan Flannery (Stephanie Douglas Forrester, The Bold and the Beautiful)
Kelly Monaco (Sam McCall, General Hospital)
Kim Zimmer (Reva Lewis, Guiding Light)

Outstanding Supporting Actor in a Drama Series
Tyler Christopher (Nikolas Cassadine, General Hospital)
Jordan Clarke (Billy Lewis II, Guiding Light)
Trent Dawson (Henry Coleman, As the World Turns)
Grayson McCouch (Dusty Donovan, As the World Turns)
Greg Rikaart (Kevin Fisher, The Young and the Restless)

Outstanding Supporting Actress in a Drama Series
Tracey E. Bregman (Lauren Fenmore, The Young and the Restless)
Crystal Chappell (Olivia Spencer, Guiding Light)
Jennifer Ferrin (Jennifer Munson, As the World Turns)
Renée Elise Goldsberry (Evangeline Williamson, One Life to Live)
Gina Tognoni (Dinah Marler, Guiding Light)

Outstanding Younger Actor in a Drama Series
Scott Clifton (Dillon Quartermaine, General Hospital)
Michael Graziadei (Daniel Romalotti, The Young and the Restless)
Bryton McClure (Devon Hamilton, The Young and the Restless)
Tom Pelphrey (Jonathan Randall, Guiding Light)
Jesse Soffer (Will Munson, As the World Turns)

Outstanding Younger Actress in a Drama Series
Mandy Bruno (Marina Cooper, Guiding Light)
Camryn Grimes (Cassie Newman, The Young and the Restless)
Christel Khalil (Lily Winters, The Young and the Restless)Jennifer Landon (Gwen Norbeck, As the World Turns)Leven Rambin (Lily Montgomery, All My Children)

Outstanding Drama Series Writing Team
As the World Turns
The Bold and the Beautiful
One Life to LiveThe Young and the RestlessOutstanding Drama Series Directing Team
The Bold and the Beautiful
Days of Our LivesGeneral HospitalThe Young and the Restless

Outstanding Game/Audience Participation ShowJeopardy!Who Wants to be a Millionaire

Outstanding Game Show HostAlex Trebek, Jeopardy!Meredith Vieira, Who Wants to be a Millionaire

Outstanding Talk Show
Dr. PhilThe Ellen DeGeneres Show: Ellen DeGeneres, Mary Connelly, Ed Glavin, Andy Lassner (Executive Producers)Live With Regis and Kelly
The View

Outstanding Talk Show HostEllen DeGeneres, The Ellen DeGeneres ShowRegis Philbin and Kelly Ripa, Live With Regis and Kelly
Lisa Rinna and Ty Treadway, Soap Talk
Barbara Walters, Meredith Vieira, Star Jones Reynolds, Joy Behar and Elisabeth Hasselbeck, The View

Outstanding Service Show30 Minute MealsEssence of Emeril
Martha
Suze Orman: For the Young, Fabulous & Broke
This Old House

Outstanding Service Show Host
Emeril Lagasse, Essence of EmerilSuze Orman, Suze Orman: For the Young, Fabulous & BrokeRachael Ray, 30 Minute Meals
Martha Stewart, Martha

Outstanding Special Class Series
Animal Rescue with Alex PaenA Baby StoryJudge Judy
Starting Over: Jon Murray, Millee Taggart-Ratcliffe, Linda Midgett, Joan O'Connor, Andrea Bailey, Laura Korkoian, Tracy A. Whittaker, Jeanine Cornillot, Adriane Hopper, Julia Silverton
Trading Spaces: Boys vs. Girls

Outstanding Children's Animated Program
Arthur
Baby Looney Tunes
Dora the ExplorerJakers! The Adventures of Piggley WinksPeep and the Big Wide World
Toddworld

Outstanding Special Class Animated ProgramThe BatmanCoconut Fred's Fruit Salad Island
The Save-Ums!
Tutenstein

Outstanding Performer In An Animated ProgramMaile Flanagan (Piggley Winks, Jakers! The Adventures of Piggley Winks)Tony Jay, (Spiderus, Miss Spider's Sunny Patch Friends)
Tara Strong (Dannon, Jakers! The Adventures of Piggley Winks)
Russi Taylor (Fernando "Ferny" Toro, Jakers! The Adventures of Piggley Winks)
Jess Harnell (Gumpers, Swanky, Pet Alien)

Outstanding Pre-School Children's Series
Blue's Room
Hi-5
The Paz ShowSesame StreetOutstanding Children's Series
Between the Lions
Endurance: Tehachapi
Postcards from Buster
Strange Days at Blake Holsey HighReading RainbowOutstanding Performer in a Children's SeriesKevin Clash (Elmo, Sesame Street)Julianna Rose Mauriello (Stephanie, LazyTown)
Sara Paxton (Darcy Fields, Darcy's Wild Life)
J. D. Roth (Himself, Endurance: Tehachapi)

Outstanding Sound Editing - Live Action and AnimationThomas Syslo, Timothy Borquez, Keith Dickens, Erik Foreman, Jeff Hutchins, Daniel Benshimon, Doug Andorka, Eric Freeman, Mark Keatts, Michael Garcia, Mark Keefer, Charles Smith and Mark Howlett (The Batman)Joe Pizzulo, Rick Hinson, Mark Keatts, Michael Garcia, Mark Keefer, Charles Smith and Will Anderson (Coconut Fred's Fruit Salad Island)
Mark Keatts, Michael Garcia, Mark Keefer, Charles Smith, Otis Van Osten, Melinda Rediger, Jeff Shiffman, Sound Effects Editor  (Johnny Test)
Timothy Borquez, Thomas Syslo, George Nemzer, Doug Andorka, Jeff Hutchins, Mark Howlett, Keith Dickens, Eric Freeman, Mark Keatts, Michael Garcia, Mark Keefer and Charles Smith  (Loonatics Unleashed)
Timothy Borquez, Thomas Syslo, Daisuke Sawa, Doug Andorka, Eric Freeman, Mark Keatts, Michael Garcia, Mark Keefer, Charles Smith and Mark Howlett (Xiaolin Showdown)

Outstanding Sound Mixing - Live Action and Animation
Juan Aceves (Dora the Explorer)Blake Norton, Bob Schott, Jim Czak and Dick Maitland (Sesame Street)Don Worsham (Sunday Morning Shootout With Peter Bart & Peter Guber)
Chris Maddalone, Bill Daly and Dirk Sciarrotta (116th Annual Tournament of Roses Parade)
Christopher Allan and Dan Lesiw (ZOOM)

Lifetime Achievement AwardCaroll SpinneySpecial TributesAs the World TurnsDays of Our Lives'''

External links

033
Daytime Emmy Awards

it:Premi Emmy 2006#Premi Emmy per il Daytime